Kluski (singular kluska or klusek) is a Polish name for various kinds of noodles and dumplings. 

Kluski may also refer to:
 Kluski, Wieluń County in Łódź Voivodeship (central Poland)
 Kluski, Wieruszów County in Łódź Voivodeship (central Poland)

The singular form is also a surname:
 Roman Kluska, Polish businessman, founder of the company Optimus S.A.
 Jennifer Kluska, American film director